The yellow serotine (Neoromicia flavescens) is a species of vesper bat. It is found in Angola, Burundi, Cameroon, Malawi, and Mozambique. Its natural habitats are subtropical or tropical forests and savanna.

References

Neoromicia
Taxonomy articles created by Polbot
Mammals described in 1900
Bats of Africa